The Hinchinbrook ctenotus (Ctenotus terrareginae)  is a species of skink found in Queensland and Hinchinbrook Island in Australia.

References

terrareginae
Reptiles described in 1990
Taxa named by Glen Joseph Ingram
Taxa named by Greg V. Czechura